Elections for the House of Representatives of the Philippines were held on November 12, 1957. Held on the same day as the presidential election, the party of the incumbent president, Carlos P. Garcia's Nacionalista Party, won a majority of the seats in the House of Representatives.

The elected representatives served in the 4th Congress from 1957 to 1961.

Results

See also
4th Congress of the Philippines

References

  

1957
1957 elections in the Philippines